A vole is a small rodent in the subfamily Arvicolinae.

Vole may also refer to:

Places 
 Vole, Somerset, a village in England
 Võle, Estonia, a village

Card playing 
 Vole (cards), term for a slam in some card games
 Vole, a rule variation for Ombre, a card game

Other 
 Vole (magazine), a UK environmental magazine
 The Vole, a nickname for Microsoft originally coined by The Inquirer
 "Vole", a song by Celine Dion from her album D'eux
 Vole#Czech, Czech colloquiak expression